The Young Australian Football Club was an Australian rules football club established on the 11 May 1870 in Adelaide at the Royal Oak Hotel. The club dissolved in 1872.

References

Australian rules football clubs in South Australia
Australian rules football clubs established in 1870
Australian rules football clubs disestablished in 1872
1870 establishments in Australia
1872 disestablishments in Australia